"Lights" is a song by English singer Ellie Goulding from Bright Lights (2010), the reissue of her debut studio album, Lights (2010). Written by Goulding, Richard Stannard and Ash Howes, the song was inspired by Goulding's childhood fear of the dark. It was released on 13 March 2011 as the album's sixth single overall, and second from Bright Lights. Originally a bonus track on the UK and German iTunes edition of Lights, the song was re-edited for inclusion on Bright Lights in late 2010, serving as the single version.

"Lights" received positive reviews from most music critics, who praised the song's production and Goulding's "ethereal" vocals. The song was also a commercial success, reaching the top 20 in several countries. In the United States, "Lights" was a sleeper hit, reaching number two on the Billboard Hot 100 after 33 weeks on the chart, and becoming one of the few songs to have spent more than a year on the Hot 100. The song has been certified six-times platinum by the Recording Industry Association of America (RIAA).

In 2022, "Lights" became viral on the video-sharing apps TikTok and Instagram. In response to its resurgence, Goulding and Speed Radio released a "Sped Up" remix on 1 July 2022.

Background and release
"Lights" was originally announced as a single on 8 September 2010 on Goulding's official Twitter page, with a release date scheduled for 1 November 2010. It was set to be released as the lead single from the album's repackaging as Bright Lights. However, this plan was scrapped in favour of releasing "Your Song" in order to capitalise on the John Lewis Christmas advert that it was featured in. This was followed by the reissue of the album Lights as Bright Lights.

In January 2011, it was once again announced that the single version of "Lights" would be released. A digital EP was released in the United Kingdom on 13 March 2011, containing Goulding's acoustic cover version of Rihanna's "Only Girl (In the World)" as performed on BBC Radio 1's Live Lounge on 10 December 2010.

The single version of "Lights" also appears as a bonus track on the international edition of Goulding's second studio album, Halcyon. The song is included on the soundtrack to the 2012 film Spring Breakers and is played during the closing credits.

Composition
According to the sheet music published at Musicnotes.com by Sony/ATV Music Publishing, "Lights" is written in the key of G-sharp minor with a moderate pop tempo of 120 beats per minute. Goulding's vocals span from F3 to D5 while the song follows a chord progression of Gm−F−E−Cm7. Lyrically, the song discusses the fear of the dark that Goulding had as a child, and how she could only sleep with the lights on. In an interview with 97.1 AMP Radio in late July 2012, Goulding stated, "Sometimes if I've had a couple of drinks and I come back and just like lie on my bed and fall asleep I wake up and realize that there isn't a light on and I have to turn a light on." She also explained, "It can be seen as something like a lighthouse that kind of always guides you home. I've always felt comfort sleeping with the light on, and I've always felt comfort being with my siblings."

Critical reception
"Lights" received mostly positive reviews from critics. Horatia Harrod of The Daily Telegraph commented that the song is "threaded with dark thoughts, but set to an airy pop production bordering on polite. Her voice is the real star. She has the magical ability, not unlike her heroine, Björk, to sing with a sort of controlled tremulousness: her voice aches with vulnerability but never breaks." The Guardian reviewer Johnny Dee described the song as "a welcome return to her patented folky-pop-with-some-tasteful-drum-and-bass-wobble sound".

Genevieve Koski of The A.V. Club was also positive of the song, giving it an A− and praising the song's "organic-sounding" production and Goulding's "ethereal, restrained" vocals, while Steven Hyden of The A.V. Club gave it a C, claiming that Goulding sounds too "restrained" and "aloof to the point of emotional constipation". About.com's Bill Lamb rated the song three-and-a-half out of five stars, calling it "a pleasing, catchy slice of electro-pop" and noting that "Goulding's voice has an edge of sadness and vulnerability that sets the song apart from standard dance pop", but concluded, "In a pop music world dominated by distinctive vocalists, it is too easy for a song like 'Lights' to feel polite and get lost in the shuffle."

On 8 October 2014, "Lights" was honoured as Song of the Year at American Society of Composers, Authors and Publishers' (ASCAP) 34th annual awards in London.

Commercial performance
"Lights" debuted at number 111 on the UK Singles Chart for the week ending 18 December 2010, based on digital sales from Bright Lights. Three months later, during the week ending 12 March 2011, the single entered the top 100 for the first time at number 91. The following week, it rose to number 64, eventually peaking at number 49 in its sixth week on the chart.

On the issue dated 20 August 2011, "Lights" debuted at number 85 on the US Billboard Hot 100 and at number 89 on the Canadian Hot 100, becoming Goulding's first single to chart in North America. The song re-entered the Billboard Hot 100 at number 99 during the week of 14 January 2012. When "Lights" reached number 40 in its 19th week, on the issue dated 12 May, the song attained the third-slowest climb to the top 40 by a female artist, after Norah Jones's "Don't Know Why" and KT Tunstall's "Suddenly I See". In its 29th week, the song made Hot 100 history by achieving the longest climb to the chart's top five not aided by country-to-pop crossover success or multiple releases. The single reached number two in its 33rd chart week, on the issue dated 18 August 2012, and held that position for two consecutive weeks, behind "Call Me Maybe" by Carly Rae Jepsen and "Whistle" by Flo Rida, respectively, making it Goulding's highest-peaking single on the chart to date.

"Lights" ascended to number one on the Radio Songs chart on the issue dated 25 August 2012, making Goulding the first female solo artist to send a debut Radio Songs entry to number one since Adele led the list in 2011 and 2012 with her singles "Rolling in the Deep", "Someone Like You" and "Set Fire to the Rain". The song also topped the Mainstream Top 40 during the same week, matching Pink's "U + Ur Hand" (23 weeks, 2006–2007) for the longest climb to number one by a woman in the chart's almost-20-year history. The single also made a re-entry on the Canadian Hot 100 at number 87 on 28 April 2012, eventually peaking at number seven on 22 September. In late December 2012, "Lights" spent its 52nd week on the Hot 100 at number 43, becoming the 30th song in the chart's history to spend a year on the tally. In June 2013, it became the fifth best-selling digital song by a British female solo artist in the US. "Lights" was certified five-times Platinum by the Recording Industry Association of America (RIAA) on 13 July 2015.

"Lights" saw moderate success in mainland Europe, charting at number one in Poland, number eight in Austria, number 10 in Belgium and Slovakia, number 11 in Germany, number 14 in Switzerland, number 22 in the Czech Republic and number 29 in France. In New Zealand, the song debuted at number 25 on the RIANZ Singles Chart on 25 June 2012, reaching number 16 in its fifth and ninth weeks on the chart.

Music video
The music video for "Lights" was filmed by Sophie Muller on 21 September 2010 before the lead single from the Bright Lights re-release was changed to "Your Song". It was officially released on 20 January 2011. The video shows Goulding dancing, playing the drums and the tambourine whilst different lighting effects including lasers surround her as she sings. It also shows her in numerous scenes swinging different hand-held lights and torches around giving the impression of a light painting, whilst the camera produces a bullet time effect like those used in The Matrix. The lighting rig in the video was created by a small group of students from Middlesex University.

Live performances
Goulding performed the song live on Alan Carr: Chatty Man on 21 February 2011. She performed a Saturday Session on Dermot O'Leary's BBC Radio 2 afternoon show on 26 February 2011, where she sang "Lights". She also performed "Lights" on BBC Radio 1's Live Lounge on 12 March 2011, along with a cover of José González's version of The Knife's "Heartbeats". On 22 September 2013, Goulding performed the track as part of her setlist at the iTunes Festival at the Roundhouse in London.

As part of promotion in the United States, Goulding performed the song on Saturday Night Live on 7 May 2011, along with "Your Song". She also performed both "Lights" and "Your Song" on The Early Show on 30 July 2011. On 18 January 2012, she performed the single on Late Show with David Letterman. On 11 April 2012, she performed it on The Ellen DeGeneres Show.

Legacy

Cover versions and sampling
American rapper Lupe Fiasco sampled the Bassnectar remix of "Lights" for his song "Lightwork", from his 2011 mixtape Friend of the People: I Fight Evil. American new wave band Blondie performed the song as an intro to "Atomic" in 2012 and 2013 while on tour. At the Drive-In and The Mars Volta guitarist Omar Rodríguez-López covered the song on his 2016 solo album Blind Worms Pious Swine. American hard rock band Through Fire recorded a cover of "Lights" on their debut studio album, Breathe (2016). In 2022, American rapper Fivio Foreign sampled "Lights" for the song "World Watching" from his debut album B.I.B.L.E.

Resurgence
In 2022, the song became a popular TikTok trend. Following the rise in popularity, "Lights" re-entered various Shazam, Spotify, iTunes and Apple Music charts worldwide. In response to its resurgence, Goulding and Speed Radio released a "Sped Up" remix on 1 July 2022.

Track listings

Credits and personnel
Credits adapted from the liner notes of Bright Lights.

 Ellie Goulding – vocals, guitar, songwriting
 Ash Howes – drums, keyboards, mixing, production, songwriting
 Steven Malcolmson – programming
 Naweed – mastering
 Richard "Biff" Stannard – bass, keyboards, mixing, production, songwriting

Charts

Weekly charts

Year-end charts

All-time charts

Certifications

Release history

See also
List of Hot 100 Airplay number-one singles of the 2010s
List of Billboard Mainstream Top 40 number-one songs of 2012
List of number-one dance airplay hits of 2012 (U.S.)
List of number-one singles of 2012 (Poland)

References

External links
 

2010 songs
2011 singles
Cherrytree Records singles
Ellie Goulding songs
Interscope Records singles
Music videos directed by Sophie Muller
Number-one singles in Poland
Polydor Records singles
Song recordings produced by Richard Stannard (songwriter)
Songs written by Ash Howes
Songs written by Ellie Goulding
Songs written by Richard Stannard (songwriter)